Maja Herman Sekulić (born February 17, 1949) is a Serbian poet, novelist, essayist and translator.

Biography 
Maja Herman Sekulić was born in Belgrade, Serbia, Yugoslavia, where she received her M.A. in World Literature from the University of Belgrade in 1977, and her PhD in Comparative Literature from Princeton, New Jersey, in 1986.

She spent 1990–91 in Germany, and 1992–7 in the Far East. Nowadays, she shares her time between New York City and Belgrade. She is a member of the Serbian Literary Association, Serbian Literary Society, Serbian and the American P.E.N. Center, Academy of American Poets and the International Federation of Journalists (FIJ).

She taught at Princeton University (1985–89), and Rutgers University (1982–84), and was guest-lecturer at Harvard, Columbia, Iowa, and other universities. Besides academic work, she has also edited the journal Night in New York from 1989 to 1990, and is a regular contributor to Recours au Poème, Belgrade dailies Politika and Blic, "Cultural Journal" on Serbian TV (RTS) and other media and literary journals. In 2017, she signed the Declaration on the Common Language of the Croats, Serbs, Bosniaks and Montenegrins.

Bibliography 
She has published 14 books: 5 collections of poems, 4 novels, 2 books of criticism, 2 books of essays, and 1 biography in addition to a number of reviews and prefaces, as well as 12 books of major translations, both in Serbian and English, and critical editions of books by world renown authors and Nobel prize winners, whose names and notions had substantially enriched Serbian literary theory and culture and built bridges between cultures. Her works have been translated into a number of foreign languages.

In 2013 and 2012, a number of her poems were published bilingually in English and French in Recours au Poeme, Paris.

Poetry collections 
She started publishing poetry since 1981, first in Knjizevne novine, literary magazine, then in other distinguished publications. 
 Kamerografija (Camerography), 1990.  
 Kartografija ( Cartography), 1992. 
 Iz muzeja lutanja ( Out of the Museum of Wondering), 1997.  
 Iz puste zemlje (Out of the Waste Land) Paideia, 1998. It came out as a bilingual English & Serbian edition, as a tribute to and parody of T.S.Eliot and as a lament over the Balkan destiny, with cover and illustrations by Mirko Ilic.  
Her e-book of selected and new poems selected by the French poet Matthieu Baumier De La Terre de Désolation (Out of the Wasteland), French translation by Elizabeth Brunazzi, July 2015. 
Lady of Vincha (Gospa od Vinče), poem, izdavač Pešić i sinovi, 2017  COBISS.SR-ID 237510668

Her poems were published in English in such prominent American periodicals as The Paris Review and Confrontation; were included in anthologies in English such North Dakota Quarterly, "Out of Yugoslavia" anthology,1993; The Paris Review, New York, 1992 translated by Mark Strand, American Poet Laureate; The Printed Matter, Tokyo, 1992; in German, anthology Das Buch der Rånder Lyrik, Wieser Verlag,1995; bilingual selections in French and English at Recours au Poeme, Paris, 2012 and 2013 and in a book 2015.

Novels 
 Kralj svile, 2000, 2001.   (Maya Herman, "In Search of the Silk King", a novel, Xlibris, 2005, Library of Congress 2005902697) 
 Slike kojih nema, (Pictures not taken), 2009. 
 U potrazi za Lolitom (Looking for Lolita), 2011. (new, changed "female" edition of the novel Slike kojih nema), English translation in preparation for publication 
 Ma Belle, prva americka dama Srbije, 2015, Sluzbeni glasnik, Beograd

Essays 
 Skice za portrete (Sketches for Portraits) A collection of essays and conversations with colleagues and friends, American and international authors ranging from Joseph Brodsky to Bret Easton Ellis.  
 Knjizevnost prestupa (Literuture of Transgression) First published in English as a series of essays in James Joyce Quarterly and European Studies Journal, then as doctoral dissertation ( The Fall of Hyperbaton: Parodic and Revisionary Strategies in Bely, Joyce, and Mann,...)  
 Prozor u žadu, Prosveta 1994. A book of travel essays about travels through Thailand, Vietnam, Cambodia and Burma.  
It was published in English under pen name Maya Herman,The Jade Window (D.K Book House, Bangkok, London, 1998) ; Publisher Code: B0003/1998-2,000 The jade window: images from Southeast Asia
 Digitalna galaksija (Digital Galaxy), 2011.   a book of micro essays about the transition of our world from print to digital media.
 "Who was Nikola Tesla? The Genius who gave us Light" Zavod za udzbenike 2015, Belgrade,.

Other publications 
Besides the books for adults, Maja Herman Sekulić published a book for children Slon Lala Tulipan, ili kako je otkriven porcelan with illustrations by Dobrosav Bob Zivkovic (Decje novine), and for English and German publications of Elephant Lala the Tulipe, or how porcelain was invented with illustrations by Sibille Schwarz; she also published a poem for children in English Lazar, the Lizard in a Blizzard (Waldo Tribune, Southampton, 2000). 
She wrote an introduction for a book of photography (Black Horse Book, New York) by the famous Italian photographer Marco Glaviano. She was a contributor to another book of photography Skin by distinguished French photographer Laurent Elie Badessi (Edition Stemmle, Zurich–New York). She closely collaborated with Italian theatre director Paolo Magelli on a dramaturgy of the longest running production in Belgrade Drama Theater of Harold and Maude, and did a Serbian adaptation of the life of the famous British author, Dame Rebecca West, which is awaiting its Serbian theatre production.

Translations 
Maja Herman Sekulić is actively involved on introducing Serbian literature to English speaking world and building bridges between cultures with her literary translations in both English and Serbian. She was invited to be the editor of an Anthology of Modern Yugoslav Poetry (Micromegas, Iowa, 1985); her translations of Serbian poets were included in five poetry anthologies in English of which the most important is Serbian Poetry from Beginnings to the Present, edited by Holton and Mihailovich, (Yale, New Haven, 1988). As a connoisseur of Anglo-American and world literature, she published many reviews, essays, prefaces and edited and translated a number of books by classics as well as younger authors such as Bret Easton Ellis’ The Rules of Attraction in two editions (BIGZ, 1989, Laguna, 2009). Since 1976, when as a student, she wrote her first introduction and made a selection of poems by Jure Kaštelan (Rad, Beograd) to this day she translated books of two Nobel prize winners such as Saul Bellow (Dangling Man) and Patrick White (Selected Stories) and she edited and translated into Serbian the first major collection of Wallace Stevens' poems (Pesme našeg podneblja, Matica Srpska/Pismo, 1995). With her translations and essays she was often the first to introduce new names and critical notions in Serbian language and culture. Among such contributions are her translation and postface to Harold Bloom's The Anxiety of Influence (Antiteticka kritika,); her selection, preface and translations of Northrop Frye's essays under title Myth and Structure (Mit I struktura, Svjetlost, Sarajevo, 1991) , as well as her translation and postface to Raymond Carver's Cathedral(Katedrala, Narodna Knjiga, Beograd).

References

External links 
 Website/Maya Herman
 Google books/Interviews With Northrop Frye
 Paidea/Out of the Waste Land

1949 births
Serbian expatriates in the United States
Writers from Belgrade
Serbian women poets
Serbian translators
Living people
Serbian–English translators
English–Serbian translators
Serbian women writers
Signatories of the Declaration on the Common Language